Sophie Maude Bennett (born February 6, 1989) is a Canadian actress, singer, dancer, producer, director, and project manager. She is best known for her role as Stevie Lake #1 on the Australian television series The Saddle Club.

Career

The Saddle Club 
In 2000, at the age of 11, Bennett moved to Australia for six months after being cast as Stevie Lake #1 in "The Saddle Club". During the show's sporadic run, Bennett has released four albums with her co-stars under the name The Saddle Club, all of which have made the Australian charts with two earning "Gold" status.

Bennett and other cast members performed The Saddle Club Arena Show on horseback during the Sydney Royal Easter Show in 2004 at the Sydney SuperDome.

Music 
From 2001 to 2004, Bennett recorded five Saddle Club albums (Fun For Everyone, On Top Of The World, Friends Forever, Hello World: The Best Of The Saddle Club, Saddle Club Greatest Hits , Summer With The Saddle Club, and Secrets & Dreams). In 2003, Bennett was signed with Shock Records, and has released five CDs and two singles with former Saddle Club co-star Kia Luby.

After The Saddle Club 
After graduating from Vaughan Road Academy in 2007 Sophie went on to study Media, Theory and Production at The University of Western Ontario. Today Sophie Bennett works as a director and producer in Canada. Sophie is also a project manager in Toronto, Ontario, Canada and runs her own YouTube channel.

Filmography

Discography

The Saddle Club soundtracks 

Fun For Everyone (2002)
On Top of the World (2003)
Friends Forever (2003)
Secrets & Dreams (2004)
Hello World – The Best Of The Saddle Club (2004)
Summer With The Saddle Club (2008)
The Saddle Club – Greatest Hits (2009)
Grand Gallop – Hello World (2009)

Sophie and Kia: albums 

 Planet Tokyo (2005) – Australia
 He's Everything (2005) – Australia
 Raw Beauty (2005) – Australia
 Spin (2005) – Australia
 Raw Beauty Acoustic Sessions (2005) – Australia

Solo singles 

Nothing To Say
I'd Rather Be With You
I Just Wanna Belong

References

External links
 Sophie Bennett on IMDb

1989 births
Actresses from Toronto
Canadian child actresses
Canadian film actresses
Canadian television actresses
Living people
Musicians from Toronto
21st-century Canadian women singers